The Old Red Lion is a Grade II listed public house at 42 Kennington Park Road, Kennington, London.

It was built in 1933 on the site of another pub built in about 1750.

References

External links

Grade II listed buildings in the London Borough of Lambeth
Grade II listed pubs in London
Kennington
Buildings and structures completed in 1933
20th-century architecture in the United Kingdom
Pubs in the London Borough of Lambeth